This is a list of weapons used by Spain during World War II. Francoist Spain remained neutral throughout the world war, but Spanish dictator Francisco Franco had Axis sympathies due to Fascist Italy and Nazi Germany helping him win the Spanish Civil War. This list is only for Spain and does not cover the Blue Division, which was a part of the Wehrmacht and not the Spanish Army.

Small arms

Rifles 

 Mauser Model 1893
 Spanish M43 Mauser (Spanish K98k)
 Mauser Gewehr 98
 Vetterli-Vitali M1887/15
 Steyr-Mannlicher M1895
 Mannlicher M1888
 Destroyer Carbine
 El Tigre: Spanish copy of the American Winchester Model 1892
 Remington Rolling Block

Pistols 

 Astra 400
 Star Model 14
 Astra M903
 Astra 600
 Ruby M1915
 Campo-Giro
 Bergmann-Bayard Model 1903: Produced under Spanish license
 Pistol F. Ascaso
 JO.LO.AR.
 Gaztañaga Destroyer
 Mauser C96 M30
 Browning FN M1903
 Beretta Model 1934

Revolver 
 MAS Model 1892
 Webley Bull Dog
 Orbea M1884: Spanish licensed production of the American Smith & Wesson Model 3
 Mauser C78

Machine guns 

 Hotchkiss Mle 1914 machine gun
 MG08
 Darne M1918
 Maxim Gun
 ZB vz. 26
ZB vz. 30: less than 1000 delivered from an order of 20,000
ALFA M44

Submachine guns 

 Erma EMP: large amounts acquired during the Spanish Civil War and copied and produced locally as the MP41/44
 Bergmann MP 28/II
 MP 38
 Star Model Si35
 Arsenal M23
 Labora Fontbernat M-1938
 Star Model Z-45

Artillery

Field artillery 

 Canon de 75 modèle 1897

Heavy artillery 

 Canon de 155 C modèle 1917 Schneider

Armoured fighting vehicles (AFVs) 

 Panzer I
 L3/33
 T-26
 Panzer IV H
 Sturmgeschütz III

References

World War II weapons by country